Vicente de Cadenas y Vicent (29 April 1915 – 21 December 2005) was a Cronista Rey de Armas ("Chronicler King of Arms") of the Kingdom of Spain.

Biography
A native of Madrid, Spain, Cadenas was born on 29 April 1915, the son of Francisco de Cadenas y Gaztañaga and Vicenta Vicent y Nogués. Beginning in 1932, he studied the fields of history and journalism, at the University of Madrid. He maintained dual professions as both the Chronicler of Arms and as a journalist. He was for many years a member of the Deputation of the Constantinian Order, of which he was Secretary and which he joined in 1960 upon the succession of the Infante D. Alfonso as Grand Master.

Cadenas founded the Asociación de Hidalgos a Fuero de España in 1954 to obtain the recognition of the untitled nobility(nobleza llana). In 1953 he founded the review Hidalguía (with the particular aim of challenging false genealogies, fake titles and pseudo orders of chivalry) and the Instituto Internacional de Genealogía y Heráldica. The following year he founded the Instituto Luis de Salazar y Castro and in the following years the Colegio Mayor Marqués de la Ensenada, the Casasolar Santo Duque de Gandía, and the Casa Quinta Vita Natural Durante, each of which were dependent on the Association of Hidalgos.

He also organized two meetings of the International Congress of Genealogical and Heraldic Sciences in Madrid (1955 and 1982) The 15th Congress met in Madrid from 19 to 25 September in 1982 under the presidency of His Royal Highness Infante Carlos, Duke of Calabria (a cousin to King Juan Carlos I of Spain who opened the meeting) with Vicente de Cadenas serving as one of three vice presidents.

He published books and articles on historical themes as well as heraldry, genealogy, chivalric orders and documentary sciences. Between 1976 and 1991, Vicente wrote articles on three of the four Spanish military orders: the Order of Alcántara, the Order of Calatrava, and the Order of Santiago. Actas del último consejo nacional de Falange Española de las J.O.N.S. (Salamanca, 18-19-IV-1937) y algunas noticias referentes a la Jefatura Nacional de Prensa y Propaganda, was a study of the last meeting of the Falange Española de las Juntas de Ofensiva Nacional-Sindicalista following the death of its founder José Antonio Primo de Rivera. Vicente reviewed the circumstances which led the Falange Española de las Juntas de Ofensiva Nacional-Sindicalista to fall under the control of Francisco Franco and the use he made of the movement. He wrote a multi-volume study of the life and achievements of the Emperor Charles V (who was also, King Charles I of Spain).

Publications

 
 
 
 
 
 
 
 
 
 
 
 
 
 
 </

Honors and appointments

Bailiff Grand Cross of the Sacred Military Constantinian Order of Saint George with Collar
Knight of the Order of St. Januarius
Commander of the Order of the Immaculate Conception of Vila Viçosa
Commander of the Order of Saint Sava
Knight Grand Cross of the Order of Civil Merit
Knight Grand Cross of the Order of Isabella the Catholic

References 

1915 births
2005 deaths
Officers of arms
Spanish genealogists
Commanders of the Order of the Immaculate Conception of Vila Viçosa
Commanders of the Order of St. Sava
Grand Cross of the Order of Civil Merit
Knights Grand Cross of the Order of Isabella the Catholic